The University of Farmington was a fake university set up in 2015 in Michigan by the U.S. Immigration and Customs Enforcement’s Homeland Security Investigations (HSI)  to expose student visa fraud in the United States. The sting operation, which was code-named "Paper Chase", was overseen by the United States Department of Homeland Security. Over 600 individuals were identified in the operation, many of whom face deportation from the United States for visa violations.

The sting was disclosed to the public on January 30, 2019, with The Detroit News reporting about the Dept. of Homeland Security and ICE HSI arresting eight "recruiters" of Indian nationality and charging them on grounds of visa fraud and harboring aliens for profit. They allegedly made more than $250,000 from the university, in exchange for recruiting students. By early February 2019, 130 students (129 of whom were from India) from multiple cities were also arrested for violation of immigration laws and might be subject to deportation, on a successful conviction. In March, ICE announced that the total number of students arrested was 161.

According to the prosecutors, the students enrolled in the university solely to maintain their student-visa status and lengthen their stay in the U.S., despite being aware "that they would not attend any actual classes, earn credits or make academic progress towards an actual degree."  Others have noted that the university was listed as a legitimate school on the Department of Homeland Security website.

University 

The University of Farmington's headquarters was in the basement of the North Valley office complex located at 30500 Northwestern Highway in Farmington Hills. Its website claimed to "provide students from throughout the world a unique educational experience" and had academic program details along with other allied information. It also claimed to be accredited by the Michigan Department of Licensing and Regulatory Affairs and the Accrediting Commission of Career Schools and Colleges and was also apparently authorized by the Student and Exchange Visitor Program to admit foreign students. The Times of India noted that there was hardly any way for prospective students to distinguish the institution from a real university, at least from its web presence. The university had a Twitter presence and the university's website featured updates such as bad weather alerts, in addition to program details and tuition pricing. The yearly fee for undergraduates was $8,500, significantly lower than many other US institutions. The university did not have any instructors or actual classes.

Reactions
According to Matt Friedman, who worked in the same complex, the university had no classrooms and he never saw anyone there. Other people who work in the same building doubted the prosecutors' version of everybody being willfully involved and asserted to have seen students arriving with backpacks and inquiring about the university, but struggling for any resolution.

Ravi Mannam, an immigration lawyer based in Atlanta, criticized the operation as "misleading" and accused the  government of utilizing "very questionable and troubling methods to get these foreign students to join the institution", since some students were under the impression that their enrollment was being made in a legitimate program. Similar concerns have been echoed from various Indian news publications.

India has issued a démarche asking for the immediate release of the students and requesting against any non-voluntary deportation. Some of the students were apparently released after an intervention by the Indian Consulate, which has also opened a hotline.

See also
 Bishop Sycamore High School
 University of Northern New Jersey – another fake university by Homeland Security (2013–2016)
 Reagan National University
 Entrapment
 Diploma mills in the United States

References

External links
University of Farmington website announcing that it has been closed
 - Wayback machine archive of the university website when it was active

Fictional American universities and colleges
U.S. Immigration and Customs Enforcement
Confidence tricks
Education scandals
Law enforcement operations in the United States
2015 in the United States